Ona Meseguer Flaqué (born 20 February 1988) is a Spanish waterpolo player. At the 2012 Summer Olympics, she competed for the Spain women's national water polo team in the women's event winning the silver medal.

See also
 List of Olympic medalists in water polo (women)
 List of world champions in women's water polo
 List of World Aquatics Championships medalists in water polo

References

External links
 

1978 births
Living people
Water polo players from Barcelona
Spanish female water polo players
Water polo drivers
Left-handed water polo players
Water polo players at the 2012 Summer Olympics
Medalists at the 2012 Summer Olympics
Olympic silver medalists for Spain in water polo
World Aquatics Championships medalists in water polo
21st-century Spanish women
Sportswomen from Catalonia